John Vance Milne (25 March 1911 – 29 August 1959) was a Scottish footballer, who played for Arsenal and Middlesbrough.  Arsenal won the old First Division in 1937–38 and he made 16 league appearances, enough for a winners' medal. At the end of World War II, he accepted an invitation to play in Mexico, alongside Tom McKillop and Jimmy Hickie.

Milne represented Scotland twice.

Honours
Arsenal
Football League First Division: 1937-38

References

1911 births
Footballers from Stirling
Scottish footballers
Association football wingers
Arsenal F.C. players
Middlesbrough F.C. players
English Football League players
Scotland international footballers
Scotland wartime international footballers
Dumbarton F.C. players
Blackburn Rovers F.C. players
Ashfield F.C. players
Scottish expatriate footballers
Scottish expatriate sportspeople in Mexico
Expatriate footballers in Mexico
Liga MX players
Asturias F.C. players
Scottish Junior Football Association players
Scottish football managers
Dumbarton F.C. managers
1959 deaths